Mankotia is an Indian surname belonging to a Rajput clan. The clan predominantly resides in the Indian states of Himachal Pradesh and Jammu and Kashmir. The name originates from the town Mankot, now Ramkot, Jammu and Kashmir.

History
The chain of rulers who ruled Ramkote descended from Raja Sarbahladhar (765-801 AD). He was a religious ruler and a great devotee of sadhus and saints. According to Nargis, a Peer Roshan Shah Vali reached Jammu and told this king that he will have to face Muslim invaders but finally he will remain unhurt and safe. Therefore upon his death Raja built a tomb for the Peer. One of his descendants, Raja Bajjrala Dhar found this Venerth town in northeast of Jammu. At that time it was part of Jasrota Kingdom founded by Raja Jasdev and handed it over to Raja Karandev. However Karandev's eldest son Raja Bhuj Dev extended his rule to Surinsar and established a new kingdom of Babbarhgar known as Bhabbapur in Rajtrangani. This place is known as Bhabore in moderen times. Raja Karan Dev gifted this kingdom to his grandson Raja Manak Dev  in the name of Manipur who built a fort on the bank of Basanter Nallah and named this capital as Mankote. After the death of Raja Bhoj Dev in the battle with Nasar- ul-Din I Bikrami 1032, his eldest son Bhrorak became Raja of Mankot and his descendants sobriquet as Mankotia Rajputs. The second son Raja Avtar Dev sat on the throne of Jammu kingdom. The third son was given Jasrota kingdom. In the olden times Jasrota had been a very flourishing town and the Jasrota was named after the name of his son Jas Dev and the descendants of Raja Karan Dev established their capital in Jasrota. The descendants of this clan sobriquet as Jasrotia Rajputs.In the times of  Maharaja Ranjit Singh of Punjab, Jasrota was given to Raja Hira Singh, a one time very close confidante of  the Maharaja. With the killing of Raja Hira Singh, Jasrota turned into ruins and became a jungle. The palaces of repute in the past were demolished. His descendants are known as Mankotias. It was renamed by Raja Suchet Singh (1822-43) as Ramkote.

According to some traditions, the Mankotia's origins are actually from the Kachwaha Rajput, a Dogra sub-group, meaning their customs share similar Dogras.

Notables 
Balwant Singh Mankotia, Indian politician

References 

Dogra
Rajput clans of Himachal Pradesh
People from Kathua district